Ebersdorf bei Coburg is a municipality in the district of Coburg in Bavaria in Germany.

Geography

Location 
Ebersdorf lies on the upper course of the river Füllbach, a tributary of the Itz, and at the northern edge of the Lichtenfels Forest (Lichtenfelser Forst).

Subdivisions 
Ebersdorf is divided into 6 Ortsteile:
 Ebersdorf
 Friesendorf
 Frohnlach
 Großgarnstadt
 Kleingarnstadt
 Oberfüllbach

Transport 
Ebersdorf can be reached by car via motorway A 73 Suhl-Coburg-Nuremberg. Ebersdorf has a station at Eisenach–Lichtenfels railway. The Steinach Valley Railway from Ebersdorf to Neustadt bei Coburg has first been disrupted by the Inner German Border and was later lifted in 2000.

References

Coburg (district)